Glen Raven is a census-designated place (CDP) in Alamance County, North Carolina, United States. It is part of the Burlington, North Carolina Metropolitan Statistical Area. The population was 2,750 at the 2010 census.

History
The area of current Glen Raven was once occupied by Altamahaw-Ossipee Native American people.

A fabric manufacturer by the name of John Quinten Gant used the land as the headquarters of present-day Glen Raven Fabrics.

Accolades
Glen Raven Fabrics created the fabric used to make the first American flag that was planted on the moon.

Glen Raven Inc. were awarded the "International Seal of Recommendation for Fabrics/Umbrellas/Awnings" by the Skin Cancer Foundation.

Geography
Glen Raven is at 36°7°3" North 79°28°13°" West.

Topography
Glen Raven is in the Piedmont Triad region of North Carolina and is located at an elevation of  directly north of the city of Burlington.

Business and economy
Glen Raven, Inc. is constitutes a major part of the town's economy. The company was founded in 1880, starting out as a cotton mill making only apparel. The company has grown tremendously since, performing, dying, spinning, weaving and finishing, all the way down to distribution and logistics. Glen Raven provides Alamance County, fast-food, pawn shopping, pharmacy, a church, and more. Glen Raven contains a lot of unemployed citizens below the poverty line. Glen Raven average house income is very low. The town's largest companies are:

 Food Lion
 McDonald's
 CVS
 Auto-Zone Parts
 Hardee's
 Family Dollar

Education
The closest school to Glen Raven is a two-minute drive to Hillcrest Elementary School in Burlington. The students in Glen Raven go to Hillcrest as their elementary school, Turrentine as their middle school, and Walter M. Williams as their high school, all located in Burlington.

Demographics

As of the census of 2010, there were 2,750 people, 1,038 households, and 779 families residing in the CDP. The population density was 785.7 people per square mile (301.8/km2). There was 1,152 housing units at an average density of 329.1 per square mile (126.6/km2). The racial makeup of the CDP was 78.7% White, 12.5% Black or African-American, 0.6% Native American, 0.6% Asian, 0.04% Native Hawaiian or other Pacific Islander, 5.5% some other race, and 2.1% two or more races. Persons of Hispanic or Latino ethnicity (of any race) made up 12.4% of the population.

There were 1,038 households, out of which 36.9% had children under the age of 18 living with them. 53.9% of households were headed by married couples, while 15.1% had a female householder with no husband present.

References

Census-designated places in North Carolina
Census-designated places in Alamance County, North Carolina